S.O.S. is a 1928 British silent adventure film directed by Leslie S. Hiscott and starring Robert Loraine, Bramwell Fletcher and Ursula Jeans. The film takes its title from the morse code distress signal S.O.S. It was made at Lime Grove Studios.

The film marked director Hiscott's first move from comedy films, which he had begun his career making, into the straight dramatic films that would become best known for.

Cast
 Robert Loraine as Owen Herriott 
 Bramwell Fletcher as Herriott 
 Ursula Jeans as Lady Weir 
 Lewis Dayton as Sir Julian Weir 
 Andrée Sacré as Judy Weir 
 Campbell Gullan as Karensky 
 Anita Sharp-Bolster as Mme. Karensky 
 Viola Lyel as Effie

References

Bibliography
 Low, Rachel. The History of British Film: Volume IV, 1918–1929. Routledge, 1997.

External links

1928 films
1920s adventure drama films
1920s English-language films
Films directed by Leslie S. Hiscott
British silent feature films
Films shot at Lime Grove Studios
British black-and-white films
British adventure drama films
1928 drama films
1920s British films
Silent drama films
Silent adventure films